Terrein is a fungal metabolite of Aspergillus species.  Terrein forms pale yellow crystal needles. Terrein has a strong cytotoxic activity against cells with colorectal carcinoma. The strain S020 from the fungus Aspergillus terreus has the highest rate in producing terrein.

References 

Mycotoxins
Cyclopentenes